Lunar Module Eagle (LM-5) is the spacecraft that served as the crewed lunar lander of Apollo 11, which was the first mission to land humans on the Moon. It was named after the bald eagle, which was featured prominently on the mission insignia. It flew from Earth to lunar orbit on the command module Columbia, and then was flown to the Moon on July 20, 1969, by astronaut Neil Armstrong with navigational assistance from Buzz Aldrin. Eagles landing created Tranquility Base, named by Armstrong and Aldrin and first announced upon the module's touchdown.

The name of the craft gave rise to the phrase "The Eagle has Landed", the words Armstrong said upon Eagles  touchdown. The phrase was used as the title of a best-selling 1975 book, set during the Second World War, and the 1976 film adaptation.

Flight 

Eagle was launched with command module Columbia on July 16, 1969, atop a Saturn V launch vehicle from Launch Complex 39A, and entered Earth orbit 12 minutes later.

Eagle entered lunar orbit on July 19, 1969. On July 20, Neil Armstrong and Buzz Aldrin entered into the LM and separated it from Command module Columbia.

After the lunar surface operations, Armstrong and Aldrin returned to the Lunar Module Eagle on July 21, 1969.

At 17:54:00 UTC, they lifted off in Eagle ascent stage to rejoin Michael Collins aboard Columbia in lunar orbit.

After the crew re-boarded Columbia, the Eagle was abandoned in lunar orbit. Although its ultimate fate remains unknown, some calculations by the physicist James Meador published in 2021 showed that Eagle could theoretically still be in lunar orbit.

Gallery

See also 

 List of artificial objects on the Moon
 List of crewed lunar landers

Notes

References

Further reading 

  
 
 
 
 
 
 

Individual space vehicles
Spacecraft launched in 1969
Buzz Aldrin
Neil Armstrong
Crewed spacecraft
Apollo program hardware
Spacecraft launched by Saturn rockets
Spacecraft that orbited the Moon
Apollo 11
Soft landings on the Moon
1969 on the Moon
Articles containing video clips